The Île de l'Ouest is a French island in the Kerguelen archipelago located west of Grande Terre in the extension of the Lakes peninsula, by the foothills of the Cook glacier. It has two bays:Noroît Bay to the north and Bretonne Bay to the south.

It is divided by the Grande Terre by the détroit de la Marianne (Marianne's strait). 
The highest point is a mountain named Pic Philippe d'Orléans, at 617 metres.

References
 Kerguelen islands map, Géoportail IGN.
 General view of non-metropolitan France, Maison de la Géographie.

Ouest